Elizabeth Alderfer (born February 5, 1986) is an American actress who is known for her role as Olivia in the Netflix comedy television series Disjointed and her recurring role as Lynette in NBC/Peacock comedy series A.P. Bio. Most recently, she played main character Lizzie on the CBS sitcom United States of Al.

Biography
Alderfer is known for playing the character Olivia in the Netflix original series Disjointed. The character Olivia worked at the pot dispensary and was a love interest of Travis. The show was cancelled after its lone two-part season. She has also played the character Sarah in a few General Electric television ads. From 2019 through 2021, she had a recurring role in  the NBC (and later Peacock) sitcom A.P. Bio. Alderfer was cast in a lead role for the 2021 CBS sitcom United States of Al.

She has been married to cook and butcher Ali Bouzari since 2018.

Filmography

References

External links
Elizabeth Alderfer IMDb

1986 births
21st-century American actresses
American film actresses
American television actresses
Living people